The Bakeng Deuce (formerly the Duce) is a parasol-wing monoplane designed in the United States in the early 1970s and marketed for homebuilding.  Plans and parts were still available in 2007, although the rights have changed hands in the intervening years.

A biplane derivative, the Double Duce was also available at one time.

Design and development 
The aircraft's configuration as a two-seat open cockpit, parasol wing monoplane, with fixed tailwheel undercarriage evokes 1930s designs, however, it was a new design by former Boeing engineer Jerry Bakeng, which won the Outstanding New Design Trophy at the 1971 EAA fly-in at Oshkosh, Wisconsin. Two hundred sets of plans had been sold by 1979.  The fuselage construction is of welded steel tube with the forward part skinned in metal and the rear in fabric.  The wings are constructed of wooden ribs and spars with fabric covering and are removable for transport or storage.

Rights to the Deuce were purchased by the Bakeng Deuce Airplane Factory in March 1999 and the spelling of the aircraft's name was changed at this point.

Specifications (Deuce)

References

 
 Bakeng Deuce Airplane Factory company website

1970s United States sport aircraft
Homebuilt aircraft
Single-engined tractor aircraft
Parasol-wing aircraft
Duce
Aircraft first flown in 1970